Euzophera costivittella is a species of snout moth in the genus Euzophera. It was described by Ragonot in 1887. It is found in Russia.

References

Moths described in 1887
Phycitini
Moths of Asia